This is a list of notable universities in India offering distance education.

Andhra Pradesh
Acharya Nagarjuna University, Guntur
Andhra University, Visakhapatnam
Dravidian University, Kuppam
Gitam University, Visakhapatnam
National Sanskrit University Tirupati
Sri Krishnadevaraya University, Anantapur
Sri Padmavati Mahila Visvavidyalayam, Tirupati
Sri Venkateswara University, Tirupati

Telangana 
Dr. B.R. Ambedkar Open University, Hyderabad
Jawaharlal Nehru Technological University, Hyderabad
Kakatiya University, Warangal
Maulana Azad National Urdu University, Hyderabad
NALSAR University of Law, Hyderabad
National Institute of Rural Development, Hyderabad
Osmania University, Hyderabad
Potti Sreeramulu Telugu University, Hyderabad

Arunachal Pradesh 
Rajiv Gandhi University, Itanagar
Venkateshwara Open University, Itanagar

Assam 
Assam Down Town University, Guwahati
Assam University, Silchar
Dibrugarh University, Dibrugarh
Guwahati University, Guwahati
Krishna Kanta Handique State Open University, Guwahati
Tezpur University, Tezpur

Bihar 
Babasaheb Bhim Rao Ambedkar Bihar University, Muzaffarpur
Jai Prakash University, Chhapra
Lalit Narayan Mithila University, Darbhanga
Magadh University, Bodh Gaya
Nalanda Open University, Patna
Patna University, Patna

Chhattisgarh 
Dr. CV Raman University, Bilaspur
MATS University, Raipur
Pandit Sundarlal Sharma (Open) University, Bilaspur
Pt. Ravi Shankar Shukla University, Raipur

Delhi 
Delhi University, Delhi
Guru Gobind Singh Indraprastha University, Delhi
Indira Gandhi National Open University, Delhi
Institute of Management and Development, New Delhi
Jamia Hamdard, New Delhi
Jamia Milia Islamia, New Delhi

Gujarat 
Dr. Babasaheb Ambedkar Open University, Ahmedabad’
Gujarat Vidyapith, Ahmedabad
Saurashtra University Rajkot
Sabarmati University Ahmedabad

Haryana 
Chaudhary Devilal University, Sirsa
Guru Jambheshwar University, Hisar
Kurukshetra University, Kurukshetra
Maharishi Dayanand University, Rohtak
Manav Rachna International University

Himachal Pradesh 
Himachal Pradesh University, Shimla

J&K 
University of Jammu, Jammu
University of Kashmir, Srinagar

Karnataka 
Bangalore University, Bangalore
Gulbarga University, Gulbarga
Kannada University, Hampi
Karnataka State Women's University, Bijapur
Karnataka University, Dharwad
Kuvempu University, Shimoga
Mangalore University, Mangalore
National Law School of India University, Bangalore
Tumkur University, Tumkur
Visvesvaraya Technological University, Belgaum

Kerala 
 Kannur University, Kannur
 Mahatma Gandhi University, Kottayam
 Sree Narayanaguru Open University, Kollam
 University of Calicut, Kozhikode
 University of Kerala, Thiruvananthapuram

Madhya Pradesh 
Awadhes Pratap Singh University, Rewa
Devi Ahilya Vishwavidyalaya, Indore
Dr Harisingh Gour V V , Sagar
Jiwaji University, Gwalior
Madhya Pradesh Bhoj Open University, Bhopal
Maharishi Mahesh Yogi Vedic Vishwavidyalaya, Katni
Rani Durgawati University, Jabalpur

Maharashtra 
Balaji Institute of Modern Management, Pune
Bharati Vidyapeeth University, Pune
International Institute for Population Sciences, Mumbai
Mahatma Gandhi Antarrashtriya Hindi Vishwavidyalaya, Wardha
NMIMS University, Mumbai
Sant Gadge Baba Amravati University, Amravati
Shivaji University, Kolhapur
Swami Ramanand Teerth Marathwada University, Nanded
Tata Institute of Social Sciences, Mumbai
University of Mumbai, Mumbai
Yashwantrao Chavan Maharashtra Open University, Nashik

Meghalaya 
Mahatma Gandhi University, Khana Para
NEHU, Shillong

Mizoram 
ICFAI, Aizawl

Nagaland

Odisha 
Asian School of Business Management, Bhubaneshwar
Berhampur University, Berhampur
Fakir Mohan University, Balasore
North Orissa University, Mayurbhanj
Odisha State Open University
Sambalpur University, Sambalpur
Utkal University, Bhubaneswar

Puducherry 
Pondicherry University, Pondicherry

Punjab 
Guru Nanak Dev University, Amritsar
Lovely Professional University, Phagwara
Panjab University, Chandigarh
Punjab Technical University, Jalandhar
Punjabi University, Patiala
Thapar University
CHANDIGARH UNIVERSITY

Rajasthan 
Bhagwant University, Ajmer
Birla Institute of Technology and Sciences, Pilani
Institute of Advance Studies in Education, Sardarshar
Jagan Nath University, Jaipur
Jain Vishva Bharati Institute, Ladnun
Jaipur National University, Jaipur
Jayoti Vidyapeeth Women's University, Jaipur
NIMS University, Jaipur
Vardhman Mahaveer Open University, Kota
Suresh Gyan Vihar University, Jaipur

Sikkim 
ICFAI University, Gangtok
Sikkim Manipal University, Gangtok

Tamil Nadu 
Alagappa University, Karaikudi
Bharath Institute of Higher Education and Research, Chennai
Bharathiar University, Coimbatore
Bharathidasan University, Tiruchirapalli
Gandhigram Rural Institute, Gandhigram
Karpagam University, Coimbatore
Madurai Kamaraj University, Madurai
Manonmaniam Sundaranar University, Tirunelveli
Meenakshi Academy of Higher Education and Research
Mother Teresa Women's University, Kodaikanal
Periyar Maniammai University, Thanjavur
Periyar University, Salem
Shanmugha Arts Science, Technology & Research Academy, Thanjavur
Sri Chandrasekharendra Saraswathi Viswamahavidyalaya, Kanchipuram
St. Peter's University, Chennai
Tamil Nadu Agricultural University, Coimbatore
Tamil Nadu Dr. Ambedkar Law University, Chennai
Tamil Nadu Open University, Chennai
Tamil University, Thanjavur
University of Madras, Chennai
Vinayaka Missions University, Salem

Tripura 
ICFAI University, Agartala
Tripura University, Agartala

Uttarakhand 
Dev Sanskriti Vishwavidyalaya, Haridwar
Gurukul Kangri Vishwavidyalaya, Haridwar
ICFAI University, Dehradun
Kumaun University, Nainital
University of Petroleum and Energy Studies, Dehradun
Uttarakhand Open University, Haldwani

Uttar Pradesh 
Aligarh Muslim University, Aligarh
Amity University, Noida
Dr. Bhimrao Ambedkar University, Agra
Indian Institute of Carpet Technology, Bhadohi, UP
Integral University, Lucknow
Jagadguru Rambhadrachary Handicapped University, Chitrakoot
Swami Vivekananda Subharti University, Meerut
Teerthankar Mahaveer University, Moradabad
University of Allahabad, Allahabad
Uttar Pradesh Rajarshi Tandon Open University

West Bengal 
Jadavpur University, Kolkata
Netaji Subhas Open University, Kolkata
Rabindra Bharati University, Kolkata
University of Burdwan, Burdwan
University of Kalyani, Kalyani
University of North Bengal, Darjeeling
Vidyasagar University, Midnapore

References

 
Distance education universities